Ab Bid (also Romanized as Āb Bīd; also known as ‘Ābīd) is a village in Qilab Rural District, Alvar-e Garmsiri District, Andimeshk County, Khuzestan Province, Iran. At the 2006 census, its population was 64, in 15 families.

References 

Populated places in Andimeshk County